Sam Swaap (Amsterdam, 15 October 1888 – The Hague, 8 November 1971) was a Dutch violinist and conductor.

Early life 
Samuel (Sam) Swaap, the son of David Swaap (1859–1942) and Elisabeth Halberstad (1853–1928) began playing the violin at the age of eight, receiving his first violin lessons from H.M Hofmeester. He enrolled in the Amsterdam Conservatorium and studied under Carl Flesch from the years 1904 to 1907.  Swaap made his debut as a soloist with the Royal Concertgebouw Orchestra at the age of sixteen and entered the orchestra's first violin section in 1909. In 1913, Swaap went to Finland for two years to serve as a concertmaster in Abo. The outbreak of the First World War brought him back to the Netherlands. Upon his return he was appointed concertmaster of the Residence Orchestra in The Hague (Den Haag). During that time, Swaap was a member of two chamber ensembles: the Haagsche Strijkwartet and the Frenkel Trio. Swaap's friend, Charles van Isterdael, played cello in both ensembles and also in the Residence Orchestra. Swaap also recorded also many works for violin solo (see list below). Most of the recordings are dated between 1922 and 1924. Swaap played as a soloist all over Europe including: France, Spain, Germany, Finland, Denmark and Holland, his home land.  Some composers dedicated some of their works to Swaap. the Dutch composer Willem de Boer dedicated his Sarabande to Swaap in 1923 and Leon Orthel (1905–1985) dedicated his Capriccio op.19 to him in 1939.

World War II 
The Nazi invasion of Holland on 10 May 1940, and the subsequent restrictions on Jews around the country affected Swaap's career as a musician. He was given fewer and fewer opportunities to perform with the Residence Orchestra and some documents point out that "his chair was pulled back", meaning he could no longer sit in the front of the first violin section. Early in 1941 he was dismissed from the orchestra. He was then fired, as were many other Jewish musicians who had lost their jobs, to the "Jewish Orchestra" (Joods Orkest) which was active from November 1941 to July 1942. Swaap became chairman of that orchestra.

In December 1942 Swaap was imprisoned in Barneveld for six months until he was transported to Westerbork.  By September 1944 he was deported to Theresienstadt concentration camp (identified as ‘Group C’ in the transport list).
Swaap lost two brothers in the war.

After the War 
On 4 February 1945, Swaap was notified that he would be transferred from Theresienstadt concentration camp to Switzerland where he could settle.
The Residence Orchestra offered Swaap the opportunity to return to his position. He accepted and on 20 November 1945 he played his first post-war concert in Diligentia. A month later, On the occasion of the Chanoekafeest, he played in Museum Boijmans Van Beuningen in Rotterdam.

In 1947 Swaap retired from the Residence Orchestra. A year later he formed the Dutch Chamber Symphony Orchestra and from that time onwards dedicated most of his time to conducting.
During the course of his career, Swaap received a number of awards. He died in 1971 at the age of 83.

Legacy 
A part of his private collection of scores and music is located in the Felicja Blumental Music Library, Tel Aviv.

List of recordings 
 Schubert: Ave Maria
 Sibelius: Valse triste
 Mascagni: Cavalleria Rusticana, Intermezzo.
 Dvořák: Indian lament
 Tosti: La serenata
 Handel: Arioso
 Bach (Arr. Gounod): Ave Maria
 Beethoven: Romance
 Saint-Saëns: Le déluge, Prélude
 Mlynarski: Mazurka
 G Pierné: Sérénade
 A d'Ambrosio: Canzonetta
 Massenet: Méditation
 Fiorillo Arr J Wolfsthal: Caprice
 Antonín Dvořák: Larghetto
 Gabriel Fauré: Berceuse op.16
 Beethoven (arrangement) – Piano Sonata no.8, Adagio
 C. Franck: Panis Angelicus
 Widor: Serenade
 Padre Martini: Gavoute

References

External links 
 Sam Swaap on youtube

Dutch violinists
Male violinists
1888 births
1971 deaths
20th-century Dutch male musicians